David Miles Danks  (4 June 1931 – 8 July 2003) was a celebrated paediatrician, medical researcher and is considered the founder of medical genetics in Australia. He identified the cause of Menkes disease in 1972. Danks was appointed Professor of Paediatrics at the Royal Children's Hospital, Melbourne in 1974.  The David Danks Professorship of Child Health Research at the University of Melbourne is named in his honour.

The University of Melbourne honours Danks through the eponymous David Danks Chair in Child Health Research and an annual oration in his name.

References

Further reading
 David Danks Obituary, American Journal of Human Genetics

1931 births
2003 deaths
Geneticists
Human geneticists
Medical geneticists
Australian clinical geneticists
Australian geneticists
Officers of the Order of Australia
University of Melbourne alumni
Australian medical researchers
Fellows of the Royal Australasian College of Physicians